"Comeback Kid" is a song recorded by American country music group The Band Perry. It was released on August 1, 2016, by Mercury Nashville and Interscope as the purported second single off their unreleased third studio album; however, in February 2017, it was revealed "Stay in the Dark" was the first track to be released from the album.

Background
The song was written by Kimberly Perry, Reid Perry and Neil Perry, and co-produced by The Band Perry and Benny Cassette. It was released on August 1, 2016.

Chart performance
"Comeback Kid" reached a peak of No. 39 on the Billboard Country Airplay chart, and failed to reach the Top 40 on the Billboard Hot Country Songs chart. The song is their lowest-charting single to date.

References

2016 singles
2016 songs
The Band Perry songs
Mercury Nashville singles
Interscope Records singles
Song recordings produced by Dann Huff